The 2022 BNXT Finals were the concluding series of the 2021–22 BNXT League, the inaugural season of the Dutch-Belgian basketball competition. The series was played in a two-legged format with the team with the highest aggregate points winning the title.

ZZ Leiden won both games to be crowned the inaugural BNXT champion. Worthy de Jong won Finals MVP, and retired from professional basketball after the finals series.

Venues

Road to the finals

Games

First leg

Second leg

Rosters

Donar

ZZ Leiden

References 

BNXT League seasons
Basketball finals